New Addington is a terminal tram stop serving the centre of New Addington, in the London Borough of Croydon, in the southern suburbs of London. The tram stop is served by London Trams, which connects New Addington with central Croydon. The next stop on the line towards central Croydon is King Henry's Drive.

Services
New Addington is served by tram services operated by Tramlink. The tram stop is served by trams every 7-8 minutes to and from  via  and Centrale.

During the evenings on weekends, the service is reduced to a tram every 15 minutes.

Services are operated using Bombardier CR4000 and Stadler Variobahn Trams.

Connections
The stop is served by London Buses routes 64, 130, 314 and 464 which provide connections to Addington Village, Croydon Town Centre, Thornton Heath, Biggin Hill, Tatsfield, Hayes, Bromley and Eltham.

Free interchange for journeys made within an hour is available between bus services and between buses and trams is available at New Addington as part of Transport for London's Hopper Fare.

References

External links

New Addington tram stop – Timetables and live departures at Transport for London

Tramlink stops in the London Borough of Croydon
Railway stations in Great Britain opened in 2000